Liss Eriksson (31 August 1919–19 July 2000) was a Swedish sculptor.

Life 
The son of the sculptor Christian Eriksson (1858-1935), Liss Eriksson grew up on Maria Prästgårdsgatan on Södermalm in southern-central Stockholm.  Following his studies at the College of Fine Arts for Nils Sjögren and Eric Grate in 1939–1944, Liss participated in the pioneering exhibition Ung Konst in 1947, before spending five years in Paris together with his wife, the artist Britta Reich-Eriksson, to study for Jean Osouf and Henri Laurens.  He returned to Stockholm in 1951, in 1975 succeeding the studio of his father previously used by Sven 'X:et' Erixson (1899-1970).  During his last years, he was working on a retable for the church Katarina kyrka, near his home.

List of works 
 Pojke som tittar på månen ("Boy Looking at the Moon"), Stockholm, 1967
 La Mano,, Stockholm, 1977
 Paret, 1976, Stockholm 
 Huset ("The House"), Lund
 Korsgestalten och Den uppståndne ("The Crucified and the Risen"), Strömstad
 Ögat ("The Eye"), Norrtälje
 La Pucelle, 1950, Lidingö
 Stående kvinna ("Standing Woman")
 Mor och barn ("Mother and child")
 Ciss III - porträtthuvud ("Ciss III - Portrait")
 Faster ("Aunt"), Västertorp
 FN-monumentet ("The UN Monument"), Djurgården
 Den dövstumme negern ("The Deaf-mute Negro")
 Källan ("The Source"), Stockholm

References 

1919 births
2000 deaths
Swedish male sculptors
20th-century Swedish sculptors
Recipients of the Prince Eugen Medal